San Miguel Dueñas is a town and municipality in the Guatemalan department of Sacatepéquez.

References 

Municipalities of the Sacatepéquez Department